Rock Me Baby may refer to:

 "Rock Me Baby" (song), a blues standard, notably recorded by B. B. King in 1964
 "Rock Me Baby" (Johnny Nash song), 1985
 Rock Me Baby (album), a 1972 album by David Cassidy, or the title song
 Rock Me Baby (TV series), a 2003–2004 U.S. comedy/drama series

See also
 "Rock Your Baby", 1974 George McCrae song
"Wagon Wheel", 2004 single with the line "Rock me mama"
 Love Me Baby (disambiguation)